Brigade E5: New Jagged Union (Russian: Бригада Е5: Новый Альянс) is a real-time tactical role-playing game developed by Russian developer Aperion. It was released in 2005 in Russia, and on October 17, 2006, in North America.

Reception

The game received "generally unfavorable reviews" according to the review aggregation website Metacritic. Mark Birnbaum of IGN called it "without exaggeration...one of the worst games I've ever played". Despite the negative reviews in the west, the game was rated the "Best Tactical Game of 2005" by many Russian critics.

Sequel
The sequel, was released in Europe on September 12, 2008, and in North America later in 2008.

References

External links
1C (distributor homepage)

2005 video games
Tactical role-playing video games
Windows games
Windows-only games
Video games developed in Russia
Strategy First games